Chicken neck or chicken's neck may refer to
The neck of a chicken
Siliguri Corridor, a narrow strip of Indian territory connecting the northeastern states to the rest of India
Chicken's Neck (Pakistan), a narrow strip of Pakistani territory that lies south of Akhnoor in Indian-administered Jammu and Kashmir